David  Raymond Cecil Elsworth (born 1939) is a retired horse trainer living in the United Kingdom.  He was the trainer of Desert Orchid, 1988 Grand National winner Rhyme 'n' Reason, and 1990 Queen Mother Champion Chase winner Barnbrook Again; three horses among a number of top-class performers for over jumps and on the flat.

Daivid Elsworth was champion national hunt trainer 1987–88.

Elsworth also trained Persian Punch to win multiple staying races on the flat, whilst his sole classic success came with the 1990 Irish 1000 Guineas with In the Groove.

Elsworth began his training career as an assistant to Ricky Vallance at Bishops Cannings in Wiltshire in the early 1970s. When Vallance lost his training licence Elsworth took a job as a market trader before setting up as a trainer in his own right.

References

1939 births
Living people
British racehorse trainers